The 1988 Pittsburgh Panthers football team represented the University of Pittsburgh in the 1988 NCAA Division I-A football season.

Schedule

Coaching staff

Roster

Team players drafted into the NFL

References

Pittsburgh
Pittsburgh Panthers football seasons
Pittsburgh Panthers football